was a Japanese dancer.

Biography
Eiko Minami was born  in Hiroshima Prefecture. She joined the Shōchiku Gakugekibu theater revue shortly after its founding in 1922 as one of its first dancers. While at Shōchiku she studied dance under the famous Russian ballerina Xenia Makletzova. Throughout her career she was active mainly on stage, though she made 2 film appearances in her life. Her best known role was that of a dancer in a mental hospital in Teinosuke Kinugasa's 1926 avant-garde classic A Page of Madness. Her second and final film appearance was in the 1927 film Tabigeinin, directed by Yutaka Abe and Yasunaga Higashibōjō. Tabigeinin is now lost and it is unknown what role she played in the film.

After her film career, Minami taught and choreographed dancers for movies at the Nikkatsu film studios and also taught dance at Nihon Eiga Haiyū Gakkō, a pre-war acting school founded in 1923 by theater director Biyō Minaguchi (水口薇陽). Minami later opened the Minami Buyō Kenkyūsho, her own dance school where she taught students.

Filmography
 A Page of Madness (1926) - Dancer
 Tabigeinin (1927)

References

External links

1909 births
Year of death unknown
Japanese female dancers
Japanese choreographers
Actors from Hiroshima Prefecture
20th-century Japanese actresses
Japanese silent film actresses